Tapley is a surname. Notable people with the surname include:

Chase Tapley (born 1991), American basketball player
Colin Tapley (1907–1995), New Zealand actor
Amanda Tapley (contemporary), American beauty queen; Miss Alabama 2008
Colin Tapley (1907–1995), New Zealand-born British actor
Daisy Tapley (1882-1925), Contralto and Activist
Harold Livingstone Tapley (1875–1932), New Zealand politician
John Tapley (1911–1956), American Negro league baseball player
Rose Tapley (1881–1956), American stage and film actress
David Tapley (born 1990), Lead singer, Irish Band Tandem Felix

Fictional characters
Mark Tapley, body-servant to Martin Chuzzlewit, in Dickens’s novel of the same name